This is a list of the first minority male lawyer(s) and judge(s) in West Virginia. It includes the year in which the men were admitted to practice law (in parentheses). Also included are men who achieved other distinctions such becoming the first in their state to graduate from law scchool or become a political figure.

Firsts in West Virginia's history

Lawyers 
 First African American male: John H. Hill (1881)
 First African American male (actively practice): J.R. Clifford (1887)

State judges 
 First African American male: Leon P. Miller (1968) 
First African American male (Supreme Court of Appeals of West Virginia): Franklin Cleckley (1969)

Firsts in local history 

 James Knox Smith: First African American male lawyer in McDowell County, West Virginia (c. 1880s)
 Charles E. Price: First African American male to graduate from the West Virginia University College of Law (1949)
 Franklin Cleckley: First African American male to serve as a law professor at the West Virginia University College of Law (1969)
 Donald L. Pitts: First African American male to serve as the President of the Raleigh County Bar Association, West Virginia (1996)

See also 

 List of first minority male lawyers and judges in the United States

Other topics of interest 

 List of first women lawyers and judges in the United States
 List of first women lawyers and judges in West Virginia

References

Bibliography 

 
 

 
Minority, West Virginia, first
Minority, West Virginia, first
Legal history of West Virginia
Lists of people from West Virginia
West Virginia lawyers